The Gazet van Antwerpen Trophy Cyclo cross 2011-2012 started November 1 with de Koppenbergcross and ended February 19.

Ranking (top 10)

Results

Cyclo-cross BPost Bank Trophy
2011 in cyclo-cross
2012 in cyclo-cross